Since independence, several rural development and extension education programs have been implemented in Nigeria.

In Nigeria, several subsequent governments have implemented different policies in an attempt to develop the rural areas and alleviate the poverty rate that has become a prominent decadence in such areas.  However, very little success has been recorded so far.

The first National Development plan spanned between the years 1962–1968, with agriculture being the major priority. The major objective was developing and expanding the production and export of cash crops. But this plan only provided 42% of the capital budget to Agriculture.

In 1970, the second national development plan was launched by General Yakubu Gowon and it lasted until 1974. Its focus was on balancing the difference between rural and urban development while making an attempt to rectify some of the shortcomings that trailed the first development plan.

The Third National Development plan spanned between 1975–1980. It made bigger and more ambitious investment programs in various projects than the previous two. Coupled with several macroeconomic projections.

See also 
 Agriculture in Nigeria
 Federal Ministry of Agriculture and Rural Development

References

 
Agriculture in Nigeria
Poverty in Nigeria